Dr. Faust Iosifovich Shkaravsky (Russian: Фауст Иосифович Шкаравский; 1897–1975) was an officer and physician in the Soviet army during World War II. He was a forensic expert. He is most famous for having overseen the autopsy of Adolf Hitler's charred remains in 1945.

Biography
Shkaravsky was born into a Jewish family in 1897 in the Ukrainian village of Kukavka in Podolia Governorate of Russian Empire ( to west from Vendychany in Vinnytsia Oblast) to Iosif Shkaravsky. In 1925 he graduated from the Kiev State Medical Academy. Prior to World War II, he worked as a civilian forensic expert in Kiev and then in the Department of Forensic Medicine in the Kiev Institute of Advanced Training of Physicians, today the P.L. Shupyk National Medical Academy of Postgraduate Education, along with Yuri Sergeyevich Sapozhnikov and Agnes M. Hamburg.

Shkaravsky served in the Soviet Red Army starting from May 25, 1941. He worked as a forensic expert at various fronts of the war. He was awarded several medals during his service, including the Order of the Red Star and the Order of the Patriotic War.

Autopsy of Adolf Hitler
At the end of World War II, Shkaravsky served as chief medical examiner of the Central Front. He headed a commission of Soviet experts that examined the remains of different leaders of Nazi Germany, including those of Adolf Hitler and Eva Braun.

After World War II
Shkaravsky used his expertise to help prosecute Nazi crimes connected to the Holocaust. He helped show the extent of crimes that took place in the Majdanek concentration camp.
 
After the war, he worked in Kiev as a medical examiner. He completed his Ph.D, Changes to the Lungs and Liver in Instances of Death by Drowning, in 1951. In 1962 he retired from military service. He died in 1975.

References

1897 births
1975 deaths
Soviet military doctors